Yves Rocher (7 April 1930 – 26 December 2009) was a French businessman and founder of the cosmetics company that bears his name. He was a pioneer of the modern use of natural ingredients in cosmetics.

Early life
Yves Rocher was born in the village of La Gacilly, Morbihan, where he grew up. After the death of his father when he was 14, he helped his mother in running the small family textiles business. A local healer taught him the recipe for a hemostatic ointment based on the lesser celandine flower, and he decided to sell the ointment by mail order with adverts in the magazine Ici Paris.

Business career

 
Natural products and mail order sales were the pillars of the cosmetics company he founded in 1959. The company grew rapidly and, three years later, he opened his first store. Yves Rocher retired from the company in 1992, passing control to his son Didier, but returned to the helm after Didier's death in 1994.

His grandson Bris was named vice-president in 2007, and took over the company completely after Yves Rocher's death in 2009. The company had an estimated value of two billion euros in 2007, and employs 15,000 people. The Yves Rocher group achieved a turnover of 2.5 billion euros in 2017.

Civic activity
Yves Rocher was also active on the political scene of southern Brittany. He was mayor of La Gacilly from 1962 to 2008, and was also elected to the General Council of Morbihan in 1982 and the Regional Council of Brittany in 1992.

His company has been instrumental in the economic development of the area around La Gacilly, with factories, development laboratories and a botanical garden. Rocher was sometime criticized for being both the area's main employer and its political representative.

Awards
Yves Rocher was made an officer of the Légion d'honneur in 1992 and a commander in April 2007. He was also a member of the Order of the Ermine.

According to the company's website and founder mission, Yves Rocher was against animal testing of products, once commenting, "If you have to test your 'products' on animals, you don't know what you're doing."

Death
Yves Rocher died in the Lariboisière Hospital in Paris on 26 December 2009 after suffering a stroke. He was buried in La Gacilly on 30 December in the presence of 5000 people.

References

20th-century French businesspeople
French cosmetics businesspeople
People from Morbihan
1930 births
2009 deaths
Businesspeople from Brittany